B. N. Banerjee (1916-2002) was a Bengali speaking  Indian lawyer and parliamentarian.

Education
After graduating from the Scottish Church College, he studied law and earned his LL.B, and subsequently his LL.M degrees from the University of Calcutta.

Career
He served as the Secretary General of the Rajya Sabha from 1963 to 1976. He was nominated as a member of the Rajya Sabha in 1976 where he served till 1982.

References

Brief Biodata

Nominated members of the Rajya Sabha
1916 births
2002 deaths
Scottish Church College alumni
University of Calcutta alumni
20th-century Indian lawyers